Nathan McGuire (born 25 February 2003) is an Irish cricketer. In June 2019, he was added to the Ireland Wolves' squad for their series against Scotland A in Ireland. He made his List A debut for the Ireland Wolves against Scotland A on 7 June 2019. He made his Twenty20 debut for the Ireland Wolves against Scotland A on 9 June 2019.

In February 2021, McGuire was part of the intake for the Cricket Ireland Academy. In December 2021, he was named in Ireland's team for the 2022 ICC Under-19 Cricket World Cup in the West Indies.

References

External links
 

2003 births
Living people
Irish cricketers
North West Warriors cricketers
Place of birth missing (living people)